Rafael Ribeiro Sciani (born October 24, 1987 in São Lourenço, Minas Gerais) is a Brazilian footballer who plays as a midfielder.

References

1987 births
Living people
Brazilian footballers
First Professional Football League (Bulgaria) players
PFC Lokomotiv Plovdiv players
Expatriate footballers in Bulgaria
Rovigo Calcio players
Brazilian expatriate sportspeople in Bulgaria
Association football midfielders